The following lists events that happened during 1994 in Sri Lanka.

Incumbents
Prime Minister: 
 until 19 August: Ranil Wickremesinghe  
 19 August-12 November: Chandrika Kumaratunga
 12 November-14 November: vacant
 starting 14 November: Sirimavo Bandaranaike
President: Dingiri Banda Wijetunga (until 9 November); Chandrika Kumaratunga (starting 9 November).
Chief Justice: G. P. S. de Silva

Governors
 Central Province – P. C. Imbulana (until May) E. L. Senanayake (starting May)
 North Central Province – 
 until May: E. L. Senanayake
 May-September: E. L. B. Hurulle
 starting September: Maithripala Senanayake
 North Eastern Province – Lionel Fernando (until 23 August); vacant thereafter (starting 23 August)
 North Western Province – Karunasena Kodituwakku (until 7 July); Anandatissa de Alwis (starting 7 July)
 Sabaragamuwa Province – C. N. Saliya Mathew
 Southern Province – Leslie Mervyn Jayaratne
 Uva Province – Abeyratne Pilapitiya (until December); vacant (starting December)
 Western Province – 
 until 10 June: Suppiah Sharvananda
 11 July-1 December: Deva Swaminathan
 starting 1 December: vacant

Chief Ministers
 Central Province – W. M. P. B. Dissanayake 
 North Central Province – G. D. Mahindasoma 
 North Western Province – G. M. Premachandra (until 27 August); G. M. Premachandra (starting 27 August)
 Sabaragamuwa Province – Jayatilake Podinilame 
 Southern Province – 
 until January: Amarasiri Dodangoda 
 January-March: Vacant
 March-September: Amarasiri Dodangoda
 starting September: Mahinda Yapa Abeywardena
 Uva Province – Percy Samaraweera
 Western Province – Chandrika Kumaratunga (until 21 August); Morris Rajapaksa (starting 21 August)

Events
Prime Minister Chandrika Kumaratunga of the peoples party, wins the 1994 presidential elections following the assassination of Ranasinghe Premadasa. 
 Many prominent hardliner UNP members are assassinated in 1994.
 Gamini Dissanayake, a former cabinet minister is killed by an LTTE suicide bomber. 
 Weerasinghe Mallimarachchi, another cabinet minister from the Colombo district is killed from a suicide bombing perpetrated by the LTTE.    
 G. M. Premachandra, a former chief minister of the UNP is killed in a suicide bombing. 
 Ossie Abeygunasekara, one of the UNP MP's was killed in yet another suicide bombing. The LTTE remains the only viable suspect.

Notes 

a.  Gunaratna, Rohan. (1998). Pg.353, Sri Lanka's Ethnic Crisis and National Security, Colombo: South Asian Network on Conflict Research.

References